Byrknes is a fishing village in Gulen Municipality in Vestland county, Norway. It is located on the western shore of the island of Byrknesøyna. The Sognesjøen strait is located to the northwest of the village.

There is a coastal museum, Kystmuseum, located in Byrknes. It is connected to the mainland by a series of bridges over the island and neighboring islands to the east.

References

Villages in Vestland
Gulen